Desaparecidos is a 2011 Brazilian horror film directed by David Schürmann. The film tells the story of a group of six friends, who after going to a party on an island, mysteriously disappeared, with frightening images of them registered by the cameras. Found by the authorities, these images are the only way to find out what happened to them.

With an independent production, the film was shot for fifteen days in Ilhabela, São Paulo. Filmed as a pseudo-documentary, similar to the American film The Blair Witch Project (1999). It is the first found footage horror feature film of Brazil.

Cast

References

External links
  
 

Brazilian horror thriller films
2011 independent films
2011 horror thriller films
Brazilian independent films
2011 films
2010s Portuguese-language films